Bereeda is a coastal town in the northeastern Bari province of Somalia. It is situated in the Alula District, which is in the autonomous Puntland region.

Location
It lies 12 nautical miles (14 miles) west of Cape Guardafui and 20 nautical miles (23 miles) east of Alula.

Administration
On April 8, 2013, the Puntland government announced the creation of a new region coextensive with Bereeda and Cape Guardafui, named Gardafuul. Carved out of the Bari region, it consists of three districts and has its capital at Alula.

Education
According to the Puntland Ministry of Education, there is 1 primary school in Bereeda.

See also
Maritime history of Somalia
Geography of Somalia

References

Bari, Somalia
Headlands of Somalia